The World's Greatest Athlete is a 1973 American sports comedy film directed by Robert Scheerer and starring John Amos, Roscoe Lee Browne, Tim Conway, Dayle Haddon, and Jan-Michael Vincent. Released by Walt Disney Productions, it is one of the few wide-release Hollywood sports films to look at the world of track and field. In the film, two coaches (portrayed by Amos and Conway) make use of a jungle boy (played by Vincent) and have him make history by winning every event at the NCAA Track & Field Championship. The screenplay was by Dee Caruso and Gerald Gardner who also did a novelisation of the film. This film was also one of Billy De Wolfe's final roles before he died the following year.

Plot
Sam Archer (Amos) and his assistant Milo Jackson (Conway) are coaches at Merrivale College. They have lost every game in every sport which they have coached, raising the concerns of the head of the Alumni Association. With only one year left on his contract, Archer decides that he is in need of a vacation. Together, Archer and Jackson head to Zambia in Southern Africa.

While out on a safari, the pair catch sight with their guide Morumba of the Tarzan-like jungle boy named Nanu (Jan-Michael Vincent), who can outrun a cheetah in full bound. Seeing this, the coaching staff quickly whip out their recruitment pen and papers, but soon fall (literally) into the clutches of Nanu's godfather, spiritual leader Gazenga (Roscoe Lee Browne). Because Nanu is an orphan and an innocent child of the bush, Gazenga believes that throwing Nanu into the world of competitive United States college athletics would interfere with his spiritual development.

Despite Gazenga's concerns, the ambitious coaches persuade Nanu to join the Merrivale College program as Nanu brings his pet Bengal tiger Harry with him. From this point forward, the plot is driven by a combination of slapstick and suspense, for Nanu's destiny as the World's Greatest Athlete will annoy several powerful people who are used to getting their way.

Nanu's innocence, Archer's scheming, Jackson's ineptitude, Gazenga's outraged wisdom, and the Machiavellian plotting of the villains all play roles in the action as the film heads toward the final track meet. The atmosphere of American competition does indeed threaten Nanu, but he is saved from disintegration by love interest Jane Douglas (Dayle Haddon). Jane and Nanu's budding relationship angers rival Leopold Maxwell (Danny Goldman), whose attempts to sabotage the budding star build toward a crescendo as the ultimate competition approaches. The climactic track meet is peppered with commentary by ABC-TV sportscaster Howard Cosell. After his victory, Nanu decides to return home, accompanied by Jane and Harry, and Archer and Jackson bid him farewell at the airport.

In the final scene, a framing device is shown where Archer and Jackson are depicted trying to recruit a new athletic phenomenon that resides in China.

Cast
 John Amos as Coach Sam Archer
 Tim Conway as Milo Jackson
 Jan-Michael Vincent as Nanu
 Roscoe Lee Browne as Gazenga
 Dayle Haddon as Jane Douglas
 Billy De Wolfe as Dean Maxwell
 Nancy Walker as Mrs. Petersen
 Danny Goldman as Leopold Maxwell
 Don Pedro Colley as Morumba
 Vito Scotti as Games spectator
 Liam Dunn as Dr. Winslow
 Ivor Francis as Dean Bellamy
 Leon Askin as Dr. Gottlieb
 Joe Kapp as Announcer Buzzer Kozak 
 Clarence Muse as Gazenga's Assistant
 Virginia Capers as Native Woman
 Philip Ahn as Old Chinaman
 John Lupton as Race Starter
 Sarah Selby as Woman on Safari
 Russ Conway as Judge with Stopwatch
 Al Checco as Dr. Checco
 Dick Wilson as Drunk in bar

The film also features many prolific athletes and sports journalists in small or cameo roles, including Howard Cosell, Frank Gifford, Jim McKay, Bud Palmer, Joe Kapp, and Bill Toomey.

An unidentified Bengal tiger actor was used to portray Harry, Nanu's companion and pet who he brings with him from Africa to California. As tigers are not native to Africa, Nanu explains to Archer and Jackson that Harry emigrated from India to Africa as a cub.

Production
Much of the film was shot at University of the Pacific and San Joaquin Delta College in Stockton, California, and in the Newhall neighborhood of Santa Clarita, California. The track scenes were filmed at California State University-Los Angeles. The live-action jungle scenes were shot at Caswell Memorial State Park, on the Stanislaus River outside of Ripon, California.

Release
The film opened on February 1, 1973 at Radio City Music Hall in New York City. It opened on February 7 in Los Angeles and then expanded on the 14th.

Home media
The World's Greatest Athlete was released on VHS in 1986, and on March 18, 1997. The film was also released on DVD on August 2, 2005.

Reception

Critical response
Upon the film's release, A.H. Weiler of The New York Times wrote: "It's a dream that is more often simple-minded than simple and generally as hilarious as finishing fourth in the mile run. It should be stressed, however, that this ribbing of the Tarzan myth runs a good, clean course that should grab all red-blooded sports fans up to and including the 14-year-old group. It might be added that everyone from coach Amos to Jan-Michael Vincent, in the title role, athletically tries without much success to make all this good-natured nonsense funny".

Box office
The film opened with a disappointing $125,000 in its first week in New York but was one of the most popular releases of 1973, earning $10,600,000 in theatrical rentals in the United States and Canada that year.

See also
 Decathlon
 List of American films of 1973
 World's Greatest Athlete

References

External links

  
 
 
 
 
 

1973 films
1970s sports films
American sports comedy films
1970s English-language films
Films scored by Marvin Hamlisch
Films directed by Robert Scheerer
Athletics films
Walt Disney Pictures films
Films about orphans
Films about tigers
Films produced by Bill Walsh (producer)
Films set in universities and colleges
Films set in the United States
Films set in Zambia
Films shot in California
Films adapted into comics
Jungle adventure films
Films about animals
Films with screenplays by Dee Caruso
Films with screenplays by Gerald Gardner (scriptwriter)
1970s American films